Binhu District is one of six urban districts of Wuxi, Jiangsu Province, People's Republic of China.

Binhu district is the cradle of the ancient Wu culture and the birthplace of modern industrial and town-based enterprises.

Administrative divisions
In the present, Binhu District has 9 subdistricts.
9 subdistricts

Education
Wuxi International School (WIS) currently occupies a campus in Binhu District.

References

County-level divisions of Jiangsu
Wuxi